Otiria railway station was a station on the Okaihau Branch in New Zealand, at its junction with the North Auckland line.

The station opened on 29 November 1925 and closed on 15 August 1993.  A leased refreshment room was open in 1969.

See also 
Otiria

References

External links 

 Photos - 1911, 1930s and 1985
 1969 timetables

Defunct railway stations in New Zealand
Rail transport in the Northland Region
Buildings and structures in the Northland Region
Railway stations opened in 1925
Railway stations closed in 1993